Danubius Hotel Astoria is a four-star hotel in the centre of Budapest, which opened on 14 March 1914. It has 138 rooms, including three suites.

The hotel is managed by the Danubius Hotels Group as a member of its Classic Collection brand. It is located on the corner of Kossuth Lajos utca and Múzeum körút; the intersection is also named after the hotel. Some interior scenes from the film Being Julia were shot in the hotel.

References

External links
Danubius Hotel Astoria

Hotels in Budapest
Hotel buildings completed in 1914
Hotels established in 1914
1914 establishments in Hungary
Belváros-Lipótváros